Henderson Township is a township in Huntingdon County, Pennsylvania, United States. The population was 930 at the 2020 census. The township includes the village of Ardenheim.

History
The Pennsylvania Canal Guard Lock and Feeder Dam, Raystown Branch was listed on the National Register of Historic Places in 1990.

Geography

Adjacent Municipalities
All municipalities listed are in Huntingdon County unless otherwise noted.
Mill Creek borough
Huntingdon borough
Brady Township
Union Township
Juniata Township
Smithfield Township
Oneida Township
Miller Township

Demographics

As of the census of 2010, there were 933 people and 394 households within the township.  The population density was 35.9 people per square mile (13.9/km).  There were 544 housing units at an average density of 20.9/sq mi (8.1/km).  The racial makeup of the township was 99.14% White, 0.32% African American, 0.11% other races, and 0.43% from two or more races. Hispanic or Latino of any race were 0.43% of the population.

There were 394 households, out of which 25.4% had children under the age of 18 living with them, 64.3% were married couples living together, 5.6% had a female householder with no husband present, and 25.8% were non-families. 22.5% of all households were made up of individuals, and 7.8% had someone living alone who was 65 years of age or older.  The average household size was 2.46 and the average family size was 2.85.

In the township the population was spread out, with 19.0% under the age of 18, 2.0% from 18 to 19, 3.4% from 20 to 24, 8.7% from 25 to 34, 20.5% from 35 to 49, 29.0% from 50 to 64, and 17.4% who were 65 years of age or older.  The median age was 41 years. The population was 50.70% male, and 49.30% female.

References

Townships in Huntingdon County, Pennsylvania
Townships in Pennsylvania